T-CAT may refer to:

Tokyo City Air Terminal
Tompkins Consolidated Area Transit